Popovka Kalikinskaya is a rural locality (a village) in Beketovskoye Rural Settlement, Vozhegodsky District, Vologda Oblast, Russia. The population was 14 as of 2002.

Geography 
Popovka Kalikinskaya is located 72 km southwest of Vozhega (the district's administrative centre) by road. Nikitino is the nearest rural locality.

References 

Rural localities in Vozhegodsky District